Lutilabria lutilabrella is a moth in the family Gelechiidae. It was described by Josef Johann Mann in 1857. It is found in Croatia, Slovenia, Bulgaria, Greece and Ukraine.

The forewings are greyish brown without markings. The hindwings are grey.

Subspecies
Lutilabria lutilabrella lutilabrella
Lutilabria lutilabrella olympica Huemer, 1993 (Bulgaria)

References

Lutilabria
Moths described in 1857